Tu or TU may refer to:

Language
 Tu language
 Tu (cuneiform), a cuneiform sign
 tu or tú the 2nd-person singular subject pronoun in many languages; see personal pronoun
 T–V distinction (from the Latin pronouns tu and vos), the use in some languages, of a different personal pronoun for formality or social distance

People and names
 Tū (Tūmatauenga), a supernatural being in Māori mythology
 Tu people, the Monguor people of the People's Republic of China
 Tu language
 Tu Holloway (born 1989), basketball player for Maccabi Rishon LeZion in the Israeli Basketball Premier League
 Tu (surname) 屠, a rare Chinese family name
 Du (surname) 杜 or Tu, a common Chinese family name

Music
 Tú (Canadian band), a Canadian pop music duo in the late-1980s
 Tu (American band), an American duo, formed by member of King Crimson

Songs
 "Tu" (Umberto Tozzi song), 1978
 "Tu", a song by Umberto Bindi, 1959
 "Tu", a song by Ewa Farna, 2015

Other
 Tu (film) Here (2003 film) or Tu, a Croatian film
 Tu, a brand of clothing from Sainsbury's
 Tu (cake), a type of Tibetan cake

Acronyms

Companies and organizations
 TU (union), the international union for T-Mobile workers
 TU Media, a Digital Multimedia Broadcasting mobile companies in Korea
 Toimihenkilöunioni (Union of Salaried Employees), a Finnish trade union
 Tunisair (IATA airline code TU)
 Transunion, a consumer credit reporting agency
 Tupolev, a Russian aerospace and defence company
 Teknisk Ukeblad, a Norwegian engineering magazine
 The Times Union, an Albany newspaper
 New York City Teachers Union (1916–1964), commonly known as the "TU"
 Trout Unlimited, conservation group

Units of measurement
 TU (Time Unit), a unit of time equal to 1024 microseconds
 Transmission unit, a historical unit of loss in long distance telephony
 Tritium unit, a measure of tritium concentration in water
 Tuberculin Units, a measure of strength of tuberculin

Universities

In the United States
 Taylor University, Indiana
 Temple University, Pennsylvania
 Thomas University, Georgia
 Touro University California, California
 Touro University Nevada, Nevada
 Towson University, Maryland
 Trinity University, Texas
 Troy University, Alabama
 Tulane University, Louisiana
 Tuskegee University, Alabama
 University of Tulsa, Oklahoma
 t.u., a derisive reference to the University of Texas at Austin by students and supporters of in-state rival Texas A&M University

In other countries
 University of Tartu (Tartu Ülikool), Estonia
 Any Technische Universität, i.e. university of technology in German-speaking countries
 Technische Universiteit Delft, Netherlands
 Technische Universiteit Eindhoven, Netherlands
 Tezpur University, Assam, India
 Thapar University, Patiala, India
 Thammasat University, Thailand
 Tianjin University, Tianjin, China
 Tibet University, Lhasa, Tibet Autonomous Region, China
 Tooling University, an American non-profit educational technology company
 Tribhuvan University, Kathmandu, Nepal
 Technological Universities of Myanmar

Other uses
 Tren Urbano, the metro system in San Juan, Puerto Rico
 Tu Hundred, a district of Vccästmanland in Sweden
 Universal Time, "Tempus Universalis"
 Thulium, a chemical element with obsolete symbol Tu
 Translation unit, a single cognitive unit of text
 Translation unit (programming), the ultimate input to the compiler

See also
 Tú (disambiguation)
 UT (disambiguation)
 Tuesday